Sahuaro Ranch was founded in 1886, by William Henry Bartlett, a native of Illinois. The ranch, located north of what eventually became the city of Glendale, Arizona, was rich in figs and other fruit orchards, vineyards, and fields of alfalfa. The ranch has all of its historical structures restored, and the "Sahuaro Ranch Park" is administered by the Parks and Recreation Department of Glendale.

On March 7, 1980 Sahuaro Ranch was listed in the National Register of Historical Places.

Ranch history

Bartlett era (1880 - 1913)
William Henry Bartlett and his brother were wealthy businessmen from Peoria, Illinois who homesteaded lands in what was to become the future the City of Glendale founded by William John Murphy. What made an investment attractive was the completion of the Arizona Canal in 1885. The canal allowed 100,000 acres (40468.564 hec or 40468 hec (hectare) and 5642.2 m2) of desert land to be opened up to homesteading and irrigation farming. The Homestead Act was a United States federal law that gave an applicant ownership at no cost of farmland called a "homestead."
 
The Bartletts' felt this was a great opportunity to invest in fruit ranching and farming. The brothers were owners of a grain brokerage business, and were amongst the largest traders in the Midwestern farm belt.

By 1891, William Bartlett had under his control 2,000 acres (809.371 hectares or 809 hec and 3712.8 m2) of farmland near Glendale. He established a 640-acre farm (25932.255 hec
or 25932 hec and 2559.5 m2) and named it named Sahuaro Ranch. There he planted large citrus and pecan orchards. Even though he never lived permanently at Sahuaro Ranch, Bartlett took an active role in its development and had various buildings and residences built for the people who worked there and for his family. He hired superintendents to manage his ranch operations.

In 1881, the first structure in what was to become the ranch was built. It was an adobe house which served as the residence and office of Stephen H. Campbell, the first superintendent to manage the ranch. In 1895, the superintendent's residence was moved to the main house of the ranch and the adobe house was used to house the ranch employees. Bartlett had his hired hands plant figs and other fruit orchards, vineyards and alfalfa.

Other structures which were built on the ranch in the 1890s were the Foreman's House, the blacksmith shop and the horse barn. The Fruit Packing House, the largest packing house in the Salt River Valley, was built in 1891.

The farm animals raised in the ranch included cows, bulls and hogs. Between 500 and 1,000 hogs were raised in the ranch in the 1890s. Horses and mules were used to pull orchard wagons, mowers, rakes and other farming equipment.

The Guest House was built in 1898. When Bartlett's youngest son was stricken with tuberculosis while living in Chicago, his doctor recommended that he move to a warmer climate. Bartlett had the guest house building designed to accommodate the needs and comforts of his son and family.

In 1901, Bartlett had a pump house built for an oil-fired electrical generator. The pump house provided electricity to his ranch buildings with the help of a pump water. By 1905, the first automobiles were used in the ranch and Bartlett had a garage built to store his wagons and autos.

Bradshaw (1913 - 1927) and Smith (1927 - 1977) eras

In 1913, Peter E. Bradshaw purchased the ranch, and planted long-staple cotton in 1915.

In 1927, Richard W. Smith purchased the ranch and planted large citrus and pecan orchards.

In 1928, Smith built a dairy barn and raised dairy cows commercially. The milk from the cows was sold in bulk and shipped to local dairies in cans.

Richard W. Smith died in 1944. His son, Richard S. Smith, inherited the farm and established a retail dairy on the ranch, known as the Sahuaro Jersey Dairy Milk House.

National Register of Historic Places
In 1966, the City of Glendale, with the initiative of then Mayor Max Klass. began a process to purchase 80 acres (32.3748 hec
or 32 hec and 3748.5 m2) of the original 640 acres of the ranch. In 1977, the purchase was made possible by a federal grant and the City of Glendale proceeded to restore the historical structures in the ranch. After the City of Glendale purchased the land, Richard S. Smith was allowed to lease the ranch until 1980.

On March 7, 1980, Sahuaro Ranch was registered on the National Register of Historic Places after the city applied for the registration of 17 acres of the ranch. The ranch is open to the public and is located at 9802 North 59th Avenue and Mountain View.

The Sahuaro Ranch fire

On Monday, September 25, 2017 the blacksmith shop, built prior to 1927, and the granary building, built prior to 1927 and addition 1935 burned to the ground and days before that the milk house 1932 burned to the ground at historic Sahuaro Ranch. This is a terrible loss of important historical assets for the community. The park was closed on September 26, 2017 to allow for an investigation of the fires. The park has open up on September 27, 2017. The Glendale Arizona Historical Society stands ready to help and assist the City of Glendale in the investigation, rebuilding and remembrance of these historical resources.

Gallery of historical Sahuaro Ranch

See also

Glendale, Arizona
Adobe Mountain Desert Park
Manistee Ranch
National Register of Historic Places listings in Maricopa County, Arizona

References

External links
  - City of Glendale

Buildings and structures in Glendale, Arizona
Museums in Glendale, Arizona
Farm museums in the United States
Houses in Maricopa County, Arizona
Open-air museums in Arizona
Parks in Maricopa County, Arizona
National Register of Historic Places in Maricopa County, Arizona
Ranches on the National Register of Historic Places in Arizona
Blacksmith shops